The 21st TVyNovelas Awards, is an Academy of special awards to the best soap operas and TV shows. The awards ceremony took place on May 31, 2003 in Mexico D.F. The ceremony was televised in Mexico by El canal de las estrellas and in the United States by Univision.

Marco Antonio Regil and Rebecca de Alba hosted the show. La otra won 5 awards including Best Telenovela, the most for the evening. Other winners Niña amada mía won 3 awards, Clase 406 and Las vías del amor won 2 awards each and De pocas, pocas pulgas won one award.

Summary of awards and nominations

Winners and nominees

Telenovelas

Others

Special Awards
Special Medal by Altruism: Xavier López "Chabelo"
Best International Launch: David Bisbal
50 years as an Actress: Carmen Salinas
Career as a Singer: Emmanuel
Musical Career: El consorcio
Musical Regional Launch of 2003: Pepe Aguilar
20 years of Musical Career: The different generations of the group Magneto
Best Family Show Magazine 2002: Programa VidaTV
Special Award: Eduardo Salazar (on the battlefront)
Joaquín López Dóriga (war correspondent)
Jorge Berry (Information operation from Mexico)
Projection of Children Telenovelas: Rosy Ocampo
Pioneer of the Telenovelas: Irma Lozano
Lifetime Achievement Career as an Actress: Marga López
Career to the writer and pioneer of telenovelas in Mexico: Fernanda Villeli
Closing: Darina De corazón a corazón (Inevitable)
 Animation Children: Daniela Aedo

References

External links
 at esmas.com 

TVyNovelas Awards
TVyNovelas Awards
TVyNovelas Awards
TVyNovelas Awards ceremonies